The 2022–23 Mercyhurst Lakers men's ice hockey season was the 36th season of play for the program, the 24th at the Division I level, and the 20th in the Atlantic Hockey conference. The Lakers represented Mercyhurst University and were coached by Rick Gotkin, in his 35th season.

Season
Entering the year, Mercyhurst was seeing to continue its upwards swing but would have to first find a replacement for departed starting goaltender, Kyle McClellan. Graduate transfer Tyler Harmon eventually won the job to start the season but didn't keep the job for long. After just three games the two underclassmen, Owen Say and Matt Lenz, began seeing time in goal. Unfortunately, the change in goal didn't seem to provide any benefits for the Lakers. Mercyhurst began the year by losing each of its first six games and winning just once in its first twelve.

While the team was allowing an average of 4.5 goals against per game, the goaltending didn't appear to be the problem. Over the course of the season, the defense allowed all three of the team's goaltenders to come under a heavy barrage, allowing an average of nearly 37 shots against per game. In spite of those withering attempts, The team did show some life beginning in November. Once Harmon and Say began sharing the goal, Mercyhurst put together a 5-game winning streak and shot up into the top half of the conference standings.

Early December found the team's lack of offense begin to show and the Lakers went on an extended losing stretch. Over a more than three-month period, Mercyhurst went 2–11–1 and ended up near the bottom of the standings. During that time the team was able to score more than 3 goals on just 3 occasions, coincidentally, those were the only game that it did not lose. With on Eric Esposito showing any real offensive punch, the forwards were unable to provide enough scoring to offset the porous defense. Early January also saw the team abandon its goaltending rotation and stick with Harmon as the team's starter.

Mercyhurst ended the regular season 8th in Atlantic Hockey, just enough for them to receive the final berth into the conference tournament. Despite facing the bet team in the conference in the Quarterfinals, Mercyhurst was able to get a lead in both games. Unfortunately, as it had all season, the Laker's defense wasn't able to hold off the attack from RIT and allowed 96 shots in the two games. The Tigers scored the final three goals on both nights, sweeping the series and ending Mercyhurst's season.

Departures

Recruiting

Roster
As of August 16, 2022.

Standings

Schedule and results

|-
!colspan=12 style=";" | Regular Season

|-
!colspan=12 style=";" |

Scoring statistics

Goaltending statistics

Rankings

Note: USCHO did not release a poll in weeks 1, 13, or 26.

References

2022–23
Mercyhurst Lakers
Mercyhurst Lakers
2023 in sports in Pennsylvania
2022 in sports in Pennsylvania